Platycerus caucasicus is a species of stag beetle from the subfamily Lucaninae of family Lucanidae. It was discovered by Frederic Parry in 1864.

Geographical distribution 
It can be found in Turkey.

References 

Lucaninae
Beetles described in 1864